Vladimir Kopytov (born 25 September 1965) is a Belarusian former wrestler. He competed at the 1996 Summer Olympics and the 2000 Summer Olympics.

References

External links
 

1965 births
Living people
Belarusian male sport wrestlers
Olympic wrestlers of Belarus
Wrestlers at the 1996 Summer Olympics
Wrestlers at the 2000 Summer Olympics
Sportspeople from Gomel
20th-century Belarusian people
21st-century Belarusian people